Albert Edward "Cowboy" "Bronco" Jones (August 23, 1874 – February 9, 1958) was a professional baseball pitcher. He pitched one full season and parts of three others in Major League Baseball from 1898 until 1901 for the Cleveland Spiders and St. Louis Perfectos/Cardinals.

Born August 23, 1874, in Golden, Colorado Territory, Cowboy Jones was the son of Welsh immigrants Evan and Jane Jones. He married his wife Nellie on January 25, 1896 in Boulder, Colorado. They had no children. 

Jones began his professional career in 1896 with the Pueblo Rovers of the Colorado State League and made his major league debut on June 24, 1898 with the Cleveland Spiders. Jones was the first player born in Colorado to play in the major leagues, and the only one who played in the 19th century. In 1899, the Spiders' owners transferred most of the Cleveland stars, including Jones, to the St. Louis Perfectos. Jones pitched three seasons for the Perfectos, who were renamed the Cardinals in 1899. Johnson played with the Cardinals through the 1901 season and continued to play minor league baseball until 1915, when he retired at age 41 and settled in the town of his birth, Golden, Colorado. He later served as Mayor of Golden.

Jones died in Inglewood, California on February 9, 1958.

References

Major League Baseball pitchers
Cleveland Spiders players
St. Louis Perfectos players
St. Louis Cardinals players
Pueblo Rovers players
Milwaukee Creams players
Milwaukee Brewers (minor league) players
Denver Grizzlies (baseball) players
Colorado Springs Millionaires players
Oakland Oaks (baseball) players
San Francisco Seals (baseball) players
Portland Giants players
Meridian Ribboners players
Portland Beavers players
Topeka White Sox players
Paducah Polecats players
Columbus Foxes players
Jacksonville Tarpons players
Adrian Lions players
Adrian Champs players
Adrian Fencevilles players
Hamilton Hams players
Baseball players from Colorado
1874 births
1958 deaths
19th-century baseball players